Diadema is a genus of sea urchins of the family Diadematidae.

Characteristics
It is one of the most abundant, widespread, and ecologically important shallow water genera of tropical sea urchins. It is found in all tropical oceans, although is ubiquitous in the Indo-Pacific region, where it inhabits depths down to 70 m. However each species inhabits roughly separate areas of ocean.

Speciation within the genus can be difficult to confirm, partly due to hybridisation, which is at least known to occur between Diadema savignyi and Diadema setosum.

The species vary in types of sea bed they inhabit, with Diadema savignyi inhabiting sandy beds and back reef where damaged; while Diadema setosum can also commonly be found among seagrass.

Fossil record
The fossil record of Diadema is extremely poor, consisting only of spines that possibly belong to the genus, some of which go back to the Miocene, 5 to 25 million years ago.

Species list
According to World Register of Marine Species :

Fossils
 Diadema principeana Weisbord, 1934 † (fossil taxon, Eocene from Cuba)
 Diadema vetus Lambert, 1931c † ( fossil taxon, first appeared in the Miocene in North Africa)

References

Bibliography
 Nyawira A. Muthiga and Timothy R. McClanahan, "Diadema", in John M. Lawrence, Sea Urchins: Biology and Ecology, London, Elsevier, 2013.
 
 Edge of reef

 
Diadematidae
Echinoidea genera
Taxa named by John Edward Gray